The Conformist is 2017 Chinese drama film directed by Cai Shangjun. It was screened in the Special Presentations section at the 2017 Toronto International Film Festival.

Cast
 Huang Bo as Wang Haibo
Song Jia as Bing Bing

Awards and nominations

References

External links
 

2017 films
2017 drama films
Chinese drama films
2010s Mandarin-language films
Films directed by Cai Shangjun